MRS Logística S.A. (Malha Regional Sudeste, "Southeast Regional Network") is a freight rail company located in Brazil that operates  of track. It is the concessionary company that operates the Southeastern Federal Railroad Network (formerly SR3 - Juiz de Fora and SR4 - São Paulo of Rede Ferrovária Federal S/A), in the populous states of Minas Gerais, Rio de Janeiro, and São Paulo.

History
The company started in 1996, following the privatization of the state-owned Brazilian railway operator RFFSA. After winning a 30 year concession in auction for R$ 888.9 million, MRS was allowed to operate and maintain the southeastern Brazilian rail network, effective September 1996.

At the time, MRS's major shareholders were large steelmaking and mining companies, including the Companhia Siderúrgica Nacional, Usiminas, and Vale.

Its network combines the lines from Rio de Janeiro-São Paulo, Rio de Janeiro-Belo Horizonte, São Paulo-Santos and Ferrovia do Aço ("Railroad of Steel").

These lines are in the richest and populous area of Brazil (54% of Brazil's GDP), and MRS has connections to three of the most important seaports of Brazil: Rio de Janeiro, Itaguaí and Santos. The company also has a connection to the privately owned iron ore terminal of Minerações Brasileiras Reunidas (now part of Vale) in Ilha de Guaíba on Angra dos Reis bay.

The railway employs the world's most powerful cog locomotives on the line from Santos to São Paulo.

Shareholder structure
As of 2021, the control of the company is shared by:
Minerações Brasileiras Reunidas (a subsidiary of Vale): 32.9%
Companhia Siderúrgica Nacional (CSN) - 18.6%
Congonhas Minérios (a subsidiary of CSN) - 18.6%
Usiminas Participações e Logística (UPL) - 11.1%
Vale - 10.9%
Gerdau - 1.3%
other shareholders - 6.5%

See also 

 Rail transport in Brazil
 Transportation in Brazil

References

External links

 MRS Logística

Logistics companies of Brazil
Transport companies of Brazil
Companies based in Rio de Janeiro (city)
Companies listed on B3 (stock exchange)
Railway companies of Brazil
Railway companies established in 1996
Brazilian brands